The 1967 Indian general election polls in United Andhra Pradesh were held for 41 seats in the state. The result was a victory for the Indian National Congress which won 35 out of 41 seats.

Voting and results

Results by alliance

United Andhra Pradesh

See also
 Elections in Andhra Pradesh

References

External links
 Website of Election Commission of India
 CNN-IBN Lok Sabha Election History

1967 Indian general election
 Indian general elections in Andhra Pradesh
1960s in Andhra Pradesh